Stephen Adam Amell (born May 8, 1981) is a Canadian actor. He came to prominence for playing the lead role of Oliver Queen on The CW superhero series Arrow (2012–2020). Amell also appeared in subsequent Arrowverse franchise media, along with reprising his role in various video games. Following the conclusion of Arrow, Amell landed the lead role on the Starz drama series Heels (2021–present). Outside of television, he portrayed Casey Jones in the superhero film Teenage Mutant Ninja Turtles: Out of the Shadows (2016).

Early life
Stephen Amell was born on May 8, 1981 in Toronto, Ontario, the son of Sandra Anne (née Bolté) and Thomas J. Amell. He is a first cousin of actor Robbie Amell. He attended St. Andrew's College, a private independent school for boys, and graduated in 2000.

Acting career

2004–2012: Early career 
Amell appeared in two episodes of the fourth season of Queer as Folk as the Liberty Ride spinning instructor in 2004. Amell played Adam in the first season of the television series Dante's Cove; he was replaced in the second season by Jon Fleming. In 2007, Amell won a Gemini Award for his guest-starring role on ReGenesis. The same year he was also nominated for a Gemini Award in the Best Ensemble Cast Category for Rent-a-Goalie.

He had recurring roles in the TV series Da Kink in My Hair and Heartland. On December 3, 2010, Amell joined the cast of The Vampire Diaries as werewolf 'Brady' for season 2. Amell starred as the real life criminal Joran van der Sloot in the Lifetime film Justice for Natalee Holloway which originally aired in May 2011.

On October 2, 2011, season 3 of HBO's series Hung premiered with Amell starring as busboy-turned-prostitute Jason, a younger rival "ho" to Thomas Jane's Ray Drecker. He also appeared as Jim in the fourth season of 90210. Amell announced on October 28, 2011, that he had just finished filming the Christmas episode of New Girl with Zooey Deschanel and Max Greenfield. He touches on the experience of filming his first "network half-hour comedy" in an interview with Daemon's TV. On November 9, 2011, Amell was announced for the recurring role of Scottie, a paramedic on ABC's Private Practice. He also played the role of Travis McKenna in Blue Mountain State.

2012–2020: Arrow 

In January 2012, Amell was cast as Oliver Queen in The CW series Arrow, based on the DC Comics superhero of the same name. This series and role led to Amell appearing as the character on other superhero series on the network as part of the growing Arrowverse, including The Flash, Legends of Tomorrow and Supergirl, as well as the CW Seed webseries Vixen.

Amell co-starred in Teenage Mutant Ninja Turtles: Out of the Shadows (released on June 3, 2016) as vigilante "Casey Jones". Amell announced in May 2017 that he would be participating on a special celebrity edition of American Ninja Warrior. Amell demonstrated great physical abilities which was reflective of his athleticism in his portrayal of Oliver Queen. In 2017, he took part in the directorial debut of former Heartland co-star Michelle Morgan, a short film entitled Mi Madre, My Father, playing the estranged father of a six-year-old girl. Morgan raised funds for the production through a crowdfunding campaign. The film premiered at the 2018 Cannes Film Festival.

In March 2019, Amell announced the end of Arrow with its eighth and final season, which premiered in October 2019 and concluded in January 2020.

2020–present: Post-Arrow 
His first post-Arrow project was announced in August 2019 as Heels, a Starz drama series set in the world of independent professional wrestling. In December of the same year, it was announced that short-form streaming platform Quibi were developing a spin-off series starring Amell and his cousin Robbie Amell, developed from their crowd-funded film Code 8.

Professional wrestling

WWE (2015)
As an avid professional wrestling fan, Amell campaigned for a guest appearance on WWE's weekly Raw program.

In May 2015, it was reported that he was tentatively set to wrestle Stardust (Cody Rhodes) at WWE's SummerSlam pay-per-view in August. Amell made his first WWE appearance on the May 25 episode of Raw, where he had a confrontation with Stardust. Amell returned to Raw in early August; after being assaulted in the audience by Stardust, Amell got into the ring to attack him until being contained by security. Following a backstage segment with Triple H, it was announced that Neville would team with Amell to face Stardust and King Barrett at SummerSlam.

At the event on August 23, 2015, Amell and Neville defeated Barrett and Stardust in a tag team match. Amell participated in the wrestling, and, behind the scenes, wrestlers were said to have been impressed with Amell's performance. Amell became friends with Rhodes, with whom he later also worked on Arrow.

On December 21, 2015, Amell was awarded a Slammy for the "Celebrity Moment of the Year" for his dive onto Stardust during the match.

Ring of Honor (2017)
Amell returned to professional wrestling for Ring of Honor on November 17, 2017, at Survival of the Fittest. On the day of the show, Amell joined the Bullet Club faction, and teamed with Cody Rhodes, Kenny Omega, and The Young Bucks (Matt and Nick Jackson) in a five-on-four tag team match. They defeated The Addiction (Christopher Daniels and Frankie Kazarian), Flip Gordon, and Scorpio Sky, and Amell again participated in the wrestling, including being put through a table by The Addiction.

All In (2018)
On August 6, 2018, it was announced that Amell would be competing at All In, in his first-ever singles match, where he was defeated by Christopher Daniels.

All Elite Wrestling (2020)
On February 29, 2020, Amell made an appearance at All Elite Wrestling's Revolution, he accompanied Cody Rhodes alongside Rhodes' Nightmare Family for his match against MJF.

Philanthropy
Amell has hosted a number of successful fundraising campaigns via the crowd funded merchandise platform Represent.com. In 2014, Amell partnered with the charity Fuck Cancer to raise almost a million dollars with the release of a T-shirt featuring his face on the front (with a Post-it note on his forehead and featuring the organization's name). He ended up selling over 60,000 shirts from this campaign. In January 2015, Amell launched his second Represent.com campaign featuring a word he made up, Sinceriously, to benefit two mental health charities: Paws and Stripes and Stand For The Silent. In August 2015, Amell used his guest appearance on WWE Raw with Stardust to raise funds via his third campaign for children's hospice Emily's House in Toronto. The campaign raised $300,000, and Amell and Stardust presented a cheque together at Emily's House. During the Red Nose Day special of American Ninja Warrior, Amell donated $35,000 for completing all six obstacles, and an extra obstacle, the Salmon Ladder.

Personal life
Amell married his first wife, fellow Canadian Carolyn Lawrence, on December 8, 2007, in Toronto. The couple divorced in 2010. Amell married actress and model Cassandra Jean on December 25, 2012, in a private ceremony in the Caribbean, and for a second time in New Orleans on May 26, 2013. The couple have a daughter Maverick, nicknamed Mavi, who was born in October 2013. They welcomed a son, Bowen Auguste Amell, on May 13, 2022.

Filmography

Film

Television

Web

Video games

References 

1981 births
Living people
21st-century Canadian male actors
Bullet Club members
Canadian expatriate male actors in the United States
Canadian male film actors
Canadian male television actors
Canadian male voice actors
Canadian philanthropists
Canadian Screen Award winners
Male actors from Toronto
St. Andrew's College (Aurora) alumni